Mitrovica or Kosovska Mitrovica is a city and municipality located in Kosovo. Settled on the banks of Ibar and Sitnica rivers, the city is the administrative center of the District of Mitrovica.

In 2013, following the North Kosovo crisis, the Serb-majority municipality of North Mitrovica was created, dividing the city in two administrative units. According to the 2011 Census, in Mitrovica live 97,686 inhabitants, 85,360 of which in the southern municipality and 12,326 in North Mitrovica.

Name 

The name of Mitrovica derives from the name Demetrius. It was most probably named after the 8th century Byzantine church St. Demetrius which was built near Zvečan Fortress, just above the modern Mitrovica, in honor of Saint Demetrius of Thessaloniki.
The city was called D(i)mitrovica until it fell under the Ottoman rule.

In 1660, the Ottoman explorer Evliya Çelebi mentions for the first time the city with the name Mitrovica.

After President Tito's death, each of the constituent parts of Yugoslavia had to have one place named with the word "Tito" (or "Tito's") included, the city was then known as Titova Mitrovica (Титова Митровица) in Serbian or Mitrovica e Titos in Albanian, until 1991.

History

Antiquity 

There is archaeological evidence that proves the region of Mitrovica has been inhabited since the Neolithic era. Two settlements were discovered in 1955 in the industrial park near the FAFOS factory (phosphates productions), from which the archaeological site got the name. In Fafos, settlements revealed different objects of everyday use, but the most characteristic were cult objects (small anthropomorphic figures) of the Vinča culture.

Middle Ages 

The city is one of the oldest known settlements in Kosovo, being first mentioned in written documents during the Middle Ages. Near Mitrovica is the medieval fortress of Zvečan, which played an important role during the Kingdom of Serbia under Nemanjić rule.

Under Ottoman rule Mitrovica was a typical small Oriental city. Rapid development came in the 19th century after lead ore was discovered and mined in the region, providing what has historically been one of Kosovo's largest industries.

It became an industrial town, formerly the economic centre of Kosovo because of the nearby Trepça Mines. It grew in size as a centre of trade and industry with the completion of the railway line to Skopje in 1873–1878, which linked Mitrovica to the port of Thessaloniki. Another line later linked the town to Belgrade and Western Europe. During World War II, the city was part of Axis-occupied Serbia. In 1948, Mitrovica had a population of 13,901 and in the early 1990s of about 75,000.

Modern 

Both the town and municipality were badly affected by the 1999 Kosovo War. According to the Organization for Security and Cooperation in Europe (OSCE), the area had been the scene of guerrilla activity by the Kosovo Liberation Army (KLA) prior to the war. It came under the command of NATO's French sector; 7,000 French troops were stationed in the western sector with their headquarters in Mitrovica. They were reinforced with a contingent of 1,200 troops from the United Arab Emirates, and a small number of Danish troops.

Most of the approximately 6,000 Roma fled to Serbia, or were relocated to one of two resettlement camps, Cesmin Lug, or Osterode, in North Mitrovica. In the north, live some 17,000 Kosovo Serbs, with 2,000 Kosovo Albanians and 1,700 Bosniaks inhabiting discrete enclaves on the north bank of the Ibar River. Almost all of the Serbs living on the south bank were displaced to North Mitrovica after the Kosovo War. In 2011, the city had an estimated total population of 71,601.

Mitrovica became the focus for ethnic clashes between the two communities, exacerbated by the presence of nationalist extremists on both sides. The bridges linking the two sides of the town were guarded by armed groups determined to prevent incursions by the other side. Because of the tense situation in the town, KFOR troops and the United Nations Interim Administration Mission in Kosovo (UNMIK) police were stationed there in large numbers to head off trouble. However, violence and harassment was often directed against members of the "wrong" ethnic community on both sides of the river, necessitating the presence of troops and police checkpoints around individual areas of the city and even in front of individual buildings.

On 17 March 2004, the drowning of an Albanian child in the river prompted major ethnic violence in the town and a Serbian teenager was killed. Demonstrations by thousands of angry Albanians and Serbs mobilised to stop them crossing the river degenerated into rioting and gunfire, leaving at least eight Albanians dead and at least 300 injured. The bloodshed sparked off the worst unrest in Kosovo seen since the end of the 1999 war (in which 16 Serbs were killed).
The local prison was the scene of an international incident on 18 April 2004 when Ahmed Mustafa Ibrahim, a Jordanian policeman working as a UN prison guard, opened fire on a group of UN police officers leaving a class, killing three.

Kosovo's independence 

Tensions rose considerably in the city of Mitrovica after Kosovo declared independence on 17 February 2008. Some 150 Kosovo Serb police officers refused to take orders from the ethnic Albanian authorities and were suspended. Serb protesters prevented ethnic Albanian court employees from crossing the bridge over the Ibar River. UN police raided and seized the courthouse on 14 March using tear gas against Serbs and leaving some of them wounded. The explosion of a hand-grenade injured several UN and NATO staff on 17 March; UN forces were later withdrawn from the northern part of Mitrovica.

The Serbian minority initially formed the Community Assembly of Kosovo and Metohija in the city, but it has no police force. Serbs refused to accept the jurisdiction of Kosovo courts.

Kosovar leaders have expressed concern over the future of the region, stating their commitment to keep Mitrovica part of Kosovo and prevent crime or war there. With the 2013 Brussels Agreement Kosovo Serbs accepted the Pristina-run police force and courts and vote on ballots with republic of Kosovo logos. Elected Serbs swear oaths to Republic of Kosovo.

Since 2012 the northern and the southern part of the city, and in particular the New Bridge over the Ibar River are patrolled 24/7 by Italian Carabinieri from KFOR-MSU.

Demography 

The city of Mitrovica in 2011 had 84,235 inhabitants, 71,909 of which were living in the southern municipality, while 12,326 in North Mitrovica municipality. Since the 2011 census was not applied in the now four Serb-majority municipalities in North Kosovo, the data from an Update in 2008–2009 conducted by Kosovo Agency of Statistics (KAS) has been taken as official data for North Mitrovica municipality, as well as for the towns of Zvečan, Leposavić and Zubin Potok. According to KAS, 58,458 inhabitants were living in the urban area of the city: 46,132 of them in southern municipality, 12,326 in the north.

The Kosovo war and post-war conflicts, the destruction of economy, especially the operating stoppage of industrial sector, as well as other socio-economic factors, have influenced in the high emigration (whether internal, or external). While from 1948 (32,800 inhabitants) the city had a continual high growth of population, by tripling it in 1991 (104,885 inhabitants), in 2011 in Mitrovica were living only 84,235 inhabitants, a decrease from 19,29% from 1991.

In 2015, a wave of mass migration of about 100,000 Kosovo people towards Western Europe declined the total population of Kosovo for almost 5%. During this period, 4,889 people fled south Mitrovica, which resulted in a population drop to 68,400 inhabitants. In 2015 the population of North Mitrovica municipality was slightly increased to 12,223 inhabitants. In total, according to Kosovo Agency of Statistics estimation, at the end of 2015, 80,623 people were living in the city of Mitrovica.

Ethnic groups

Mitrovica is characterized with a large ethnic diversity, dominated by Albanians and followed by Serbs, Bosniaks, Turks, Roma and other ethnic groups. In south municipality of Mitrovica, Albanians make 96.65% of the total population, while other ethnic groups are Roma, Turks, Bosniaks and others. According to 2011 census, only 14 Serbs live in south Mitrovica municipality.

Since North Mitrovica did not participate in population census conducted in April, 2011, the data is taken from the update 2008–2009 by Kosovo Agency of Statistics which is considered as official by Kosovo government. However, other different institutions have done other estimates that came up with different data.

In North Mitrovica, according to the Update 2009, conducted by Kosovo Agency of Statistics, Serbs and other ethnic groups make up 92.97% or 11,459 inhabitants, while 7.03% or 867 were Albanians.

Religion 

The main religious group is Muslim. Small numbers of Serbian Orthodox and Roman Catholics exist in the city. Albanians, Bosniaks, Turks, Roma and other smaller ethnic groups are mainly Muslim.

In the results of 2011 census, 71,422 people or 99.32% of total population of southern municipality of Mitrovica, were Muslims. Orthodox Christians comprised 11 or 0.02% of total population of municipality, while Catholics comprised 42 or 0.06%.

As North Mitrovica municipality was not covered by population estimation in 2011 by Kosovo Agency of Statistics, there are no official data on religion.

Economy 

The Trepča Mines are located in Mitrovica, though they are not operating. With the closure of the complex, the influx of refugees and IDPs and the lack of investment, unemployment (estimated at approximately 77%) has been prevalent among all communities in the Mitrovica municipality.

Infrastructure

Education 

In the southern municipality of Mitrovica there are 31 primary and lower secondary schools, which, since some of the schools function in separate parallels in different areas, operate in 42 educational facilities. In the southern municipality exists also 5 upper
secondary schools. Although there is only one kindergarten, it has a large capacity, available for 300 kids.  The higher education is also provided through the Public University of Mitrovica "Isa Boletini" and University of Applied Sciences.

In North Mitrovica there are 11 primary schools, four secondary schools and one kindergarten. Regarding the higher education institutions, the public University of Pristina is functional. It hold the name University of Priština after the Serbian faculties of the University of Pristina were relocated from Pristina to North Mitrovica after the Kosovo War. However, many institutions refer to it as University of Mitrovica, including UNMIK and EUA.

There are two private universities that operate in the south Mitrovica, College "Fama" and International Business College Mitrovica (IBCM). IBCM has campuses in both municipalities of Mitrovica.

Culture 

The City Museum of Mitrovica is located there.

Sights 

The strategic position of the region of Mitrovica in the middle of two great rivers Ibar and Sitnica and its mineral wealth in Albanik (Monte Argentarum), made this location populated since prehistoric period. This region was populated by Illyrians, respectively Dardan tribe. The first data for the archaeological sites in the region of Mitrovica, begin with the researches of Sir Arthur John Evans, who was the first to pinpoint the Roman town of the Municipium Dardanourm.

In the archaeological sites of the region of Mitrovica were found traces and objects from different periods such as; neolithic, Roman, late antiquity and medieval period. Objects and figurines include: fortress vestiges, necropolis, Terpsichore figure, statues, sarcophagus, altar, jewellery, etc.

Sports 
 Mitrovica is the City in Kosovo with the most professional Football clubs, in the Country. Three football clubs are situated on the territory of Mitrovica.   KF Trepça and KF Trepça'89 are from the south of the city. FK Trepča is from North Mitrovica.KF Trepça and KF Trepça'89 the two southern club's play in the Football Superleague of Kosovo. KF Trepça play at the Adem Jashari Olympic Stadium, which hosted Kosovo's first FIFA-recognised friendly international football match on 5 March 2014, playing 0–0 against Haiti. Basketball is also a popular sport in the city and is represented by KB Trepça which is one of the most successful clubs in Kosovo.

Notable people 

Ali Shukrija, Chairman of the Executive Council of SAP Kosovo
Ilija Vakić, Chairman of the Executive Council of SAP Kosovo
Bajram Rexhepi, Prime Minister of Kosovo
Dejzi, Albanian fashion designer
Vahedin Ajeti, Albanian footballer
Enis Alushi, Albanian football player
Valon Behrami, Swiss international football player
Vukan, Grand Prince of Serbia
Stefan Dečanski, King of Serbia
Bekim Bejta, poet and translator
Nevena Božović, Serbian singer and Serbia's Eurosong participant
Milan Biševac, Serbian football player
Aleksandar Čanović, former Serbian football player
Nexhip Draga, Albanian nationalist
Xhafer Deva, former Minister of the Interior of Albania
Miloš Krasić, former Serbian football player
Nikola Lazetić, former Serbian football player
Žarko Lazetić, former Serbian football player
Rexhep Mitrovica, former Prime Minister of Albania
Rona Nishliu, represented Albania at the Eurovision Song Contest 2012
Riza Lushta, former Albanian football player
Vjosa Osmani, jurist, President of Kosovo
Xhevat Prekazi, former football player
Muharrem Qena, actor and singer
Valdet Rama, Albanian footballer
Darko Spalević, former Serbian football player
Borislav Stevanović, former Serbian football player
Sulejman Ugljanin, Bosniak politician
Stevan Stojanović, former Serbian football player
Ymer Xhaferi, Albanian football player
Diana Avdiu, Miss Kosovo Universe 2012 and semifinalist, Miss Universe 2012
Erton Fejzullahu, Swedish football player
Alban Meha, Albanian football player
MC Kresha, Albanian rapper
Goran Rakić, Deputy Prime Minister of Kosovo

Twin towns – sister cities 

Mitrovica is twinned with:

 İnegöl, Turkey
 Kendari, Indonesia
 Korçë, Albania
 Shëngjin, Albania
 Tirana, Albania

See also 
 Populated places in Kosovo by Albanian name
 Kosovo Serb enclaves
 Romani people in Mitrovica refugee camps
 Monuments in Mitrovica

Notes

References

External links

 Photo essay about serbian part of Mitrovica (2011)
 OSCE:Profile of Mitrovicë / Mitrovica
 Mitrovica North Administrative Office Official Website
 North Kosovska Mitrovica Official Website
 Jazz & Blues Festival North City
 HCIC, Mitrovica Situation – HCIC, UNHCR, WEU, KFOR (22 Mar 2000)
 Mitrovica Situation – HCIC, UNHCR, WEU, KFOR (24 Feb 2000)
 Mitrovica: North and South of a Divided City Video about displacement and reconstruction in Mitrovica.
 Burning of St. Sava church in south Mitrovica 17 March

 ESI report: People Or Territory? A Proposal For Mitrovica (16 February 2004)

 
Gegëri
Populated places in the District of Mitrovica
Divided cities
Municipalities of Kosovo
Cities in Kosovo